The 2005–06 season of the GNF 2 second division of Moroccan football.

Teams

 Maghreb Fez
 Kawkab Marrakech
 KAC Kenitra
 FUS de Rabat
 Fath de Nador
 Racing Casablanca
 Stade Marocain
 Najm de Marrakech
 Renaissance Berkane
 Renaissance de Settat
 Hilal de Nador
 Wafa Wydad
 Union Sidi Kacem
 Rachad Bernoussi
 Union Mohammédia
 Youssoufia Berrechid

Final league table

References
 The Rec.Sport.Soccer Statistics Foundation

GNF 2 seasons
Moro
2005–06 in Moroccan football